, also known as Toki Yoriaki, was a Japanese samurai warrior of in the Sengoku period. He was shugo of Mino Province.

Yoshiyori was a son of Toki Masafusa. After the death of his father, Yoshiyori became head of the Toki clan in Mino Province.  He had Ōkuwa Castle built.

Yorinari was forced out of Mino by Saitō Dōsan.

Yorinari was the father of Toki Jirō who was killed by Saitō.

Yoshiyori was the father of Toki Yoshitatsu (1527–1561), who went into exile in 1542.

See also
 Toki clan

References

Further reading
 Papinot, Jacques Edmond Joseph. (1906). Dictionnaire d’histoire et de géographie du Japon; Papinot, (2003). "Toki", Nobiliare du Japon, p. 61.

Daimyo
1502 births
1582 deaths